The Auckland Hearts is the women's representative cricket team for the New Zealand region of Auckland. They play their home games at Eden Park Outer Oval. They compete in the Hallyburton Johnstone Shield  one-day competition and the Women's Super Smash Twenty20 competition.

History
The first recorded match by an Auckland women's team was in 1935, against the touring England team, which ended in a draw. The played in the first Hallyburton Johnstone Shield in 1935–36, which they lost to Wellington. They won their first title in 1939–40, beating Wellington, and defended the Shield a year later against the same opposition.

They went on to win the Hallyburton Johnstone Shield 20 times overall, including three times in a row between 1946–47 and 1948–50 and four times in a row between 1999–00 and 2002–03. In 1959–60, Auckland competed in the Australian Women's Cricket Championships. In 1994–95, the side merged with North Harbour (previously North Shore). The side has won the title five times since 2011–12, with their most recent title coming in 2019–20. They beat Northern Districts in the final that season, with Arlene Kelly scoring 110 to set up a 67-run victory. In 2020–21, they lost in the final to Canterbury.

In 2007–08, Auckland played in the inaugural season of the Twenty20 Super Smash. They have won the tournament once, in 2013–14, beating Canterbury in the final.

Grounds
Auckland have used various ground throughout their history. Their first match, against England, was played at Eden Park, Auckland. From the 1951–52 season, Auckland's primary home ground became Melville Park, Auckland. In the 1981–82 season, two matches were played at Hobson Park, Auckland.

The side returned to Eden Park in 1992–93, and from the 1998–99 season they also began using the secondary ground on the same site, the Eden Park Outer Oval. In 1996–97, Auckland began using Colin Maiden Park for some matches, and in the early 2000s they also used North Harbour Stadium, but their main ground remained Melville Park. Melville Park was last used in the 2019–20 season. Since, Auckland have played all their matches at the Eden Park Outer Oval, the main Eden Park ground, and Colin Maiden Park.

Players

Current squad
Based on squad for the 2022–23 season. Players in bold have international caps.

Notable players
Players who have played for Auckland and played internationally are listed below, in order of first international appearance (given in brackets):

 Nancy Browne (1935)
 Pearl Savin (1935)
 Vera Burt (1948)
 Hilda Thompson (1948)
 Una Wickham (1948)
 Peg Batty (1949)
 Grace Gooder (1949)
 Rona McKenzie (1954)
 Joyce Powell (1954)
 Brenda Duncan (1957)
 Caroline Sinton (1957)
 Jos Burley (1966)
 Judi Doull (1966)
 Louise Clough (1969)
 Lynda Prichard (1972)
 Elaine White (1972)
 Carol Marett (1972)
 Barbara Bevege (1973)
 Glenys Page (1973)
 Edna Ryan (1975)
 Karen Plummer (1982)
 Nicki Turner (1982)
 Linda Fraser (1982)
 Jeanette Dunning (1984)
 Shona Gilchrist (1984)
 Lois Simpson (1985)
 Katrina Molloy (1985)
 Sue Morris (1988)
 Kim McDonald (1991)
 Shelley Fruin (1992)
 Yvonne Kainuku (1992)
 Emily Drumm (1992)
 Sarah McLauchlan (1992)
 Tania Woodbury (1992)
 Trudy Anderson (1993)
 Catherine O'Neill (1993)
 Clare Nicholson (1995)
 Kelly Brown (1996)
 Losi Harford (1997)
 Kathryn Ramel (1997)
 Rebecca Rolls (1997)
 Helen Watson (1999)
 Paula Gruber (2000)
 Munokoa Tunupopo (2000)
 Sara McGlashan (2002)
 Amanda Green (2003)
 Michelle Lynch (2003)
 Natalee Scripps (2003)
 Kate Blackwell (2004)
 Ros Kember (2006)
 Ingrid Cronin-Knight (2008)
 Stafanie Taylor (2008)
 Victoria Lind (2009)
 Saskia Bullen (2009)
 Kelly Anderson (2011)
 Katie Perkins (2012)
 Maddy Green (2012)
 Anna Peterson (2012)
 Samantha Curtis (2014)
 Holly Huddleston (2014)
 Georgia Guy (2014)
 Lauren Down (2018)
 Neisha Pratt (2018)
 Regina Lili'i (2019)
 Fran Jonas (2021)
 Maia Bouchier (2021)
 Molly Penfold (2021)
 Arlene Kelly (2022)
 Izzy Gaze (2022)

Coaching staff

Head coach & Talent ID Manager: Nick White
Coach: Donovan Grobbelaar

Honours
 Hallyburton Johnstone Shield:
 Winners (20): 1939–40, 1940–41, 1946–47, 1947–48, 1948–49, 1951–52, 1954–55, 1956–57, 1957–58, 1964–65, 1965–66, 1999–00, 2000–01, 2001–02, 2002–03, 2011–12, 2014–15, 2015–16, 2017–18, 2019–20
 Women's Super Smash:
 Winners (1): 2013–14

See also
 Auckland cricket team

References

Women's cricket teams in New Zealand
Cricket in Auckland
Super Smash (cricket)